Kénédougou may be:
Kénédougou Kingdom, pre-colonial West African state
Kénédougou Province, province of Burkina Faso